Government Arts College, Tiruchirappalli is an India Government college located in Tiruchirapalli in Tamil Nadu, India

The college was established in 1973. The college is affiliated with Bharathidasan University. This college offers courses in arts, commerce and science. Currently, the college offer 17 undergraduate and postgraduate programs.

History 
The College was established in 1973 to serve the children from the families of farmers and economically and socially underprivileged people around BHEL, Trichy.

References 

Educational institutions established in 1973
1966 establishments in Madras State
Colleges affiliated to Bharathidasan University
Universities and colleges in Tiruchirappalli